Emmalocera leucocinctus is a species of snout moth in the genus Emmalocera. It was described by Francis Walker in 1863 and is known from Borneo, Singapore, the Philippines, Taiwan and Japan.

References

Moths described in 1863
Emmalocera
Moths of Japan
Moths of Singapore
Moths of Taiwan